Guillermo Enio Burdisso (born 26 September 1988) is an Argentine professional footballer who plays as a defender for Universidad Católica. Guillermo is the younger brother of former defender Nicolás Burdisso.

He has spent the majority of his career playing in Argentina, with brief spells in Europe and Mexico. Burdisso won his first and, as of October 2014, only international cap for Argentina in 2010 in which he also scored.

Career

Club career
Burdisso was born in Altos de Chipión, Argentina. In 2006, he played for Club El Porvenir, then of the Argentine Primera B Nacional. In the summer of 2008, he joined Rosario Central making his professional debut on 27 February  2009 in a 3–1 defeat to Banfield. He also scored his first goal in this appearance.

Burdisso impressed after breaking into the Rosario Central first team in 2009, but he could not prevent the Canallas dropping into the Primera B at the end of the 2010 Clausura. He then joined his brother, Nicolás, at Roma for €500,000 (net of VAT) with option to buy for €4.7 million (net of VAT).

Burdisso joined Arsenal de Sarandí in 2011. In 2012 Boca Juniors bought 25% economic rights each from Rosario Central and third parties HAZ Sport Agency for 3,975,000 and 3,781,875 Argentine pesos, respectively.

On 11 January 2020, Burdisso joined Lanús. After two years in Argentina, it was confirmed on 1 February 2022, that he had returned to Colombia and signed with Deportivo Cali.

International career
Burdisso made his debut for the Argentina national team on 26 January 2010 in a 3–2 win over Costa Rica. He scored Argentina's second goal in the match.

International goals
Scores and results list Argentina's goal tally first.

|-
|1.||26 January 2010||Estadio Ingeniero Hilario Sánchez, San Juan, Argentina|||| align=center | 2–1||align=center | 3–2||Friendly
|}

Honours
Arsenal
Argentine Primera División (1): 2012 Clausura

Galatasaray
Turkish Cup (1): 2013–14

References

External links

1988 births
Living people
Sportspeople from Córdoba Province, Argentina
Argentine footballers
Argentine expatriate footballers
Argentina international footballers
Argentine people of Italian descent
Sportspeople of Italian descent
Citizens of Italy through descent
Italian sportspeople of Argentine descent
Association football defenders
Rosario Central footballers
Boca Juniors footballers
A.S. Roma players
Club Atlético Lanús footballers
Galatasaray S.K. footballers
Club Atlético Independiente footballers
Club Deportivo Universidad Católica footballers
Club León footballers
Deportivo Cali footballers
Süper Lig players
Chilean Primera División players
Argentine Primera División players
Primera Nacional players
Serie A players
Liga MX players
Argentine expatriate sportspeople in Turkey
Argentine expatriate sportspeople in Italy
Argentine expatriate sportspeople in Mexico
Expatriate footballers in Turkey
Expatriate footballers in Italy
Expatriate footballers in Mexico
Expatriate footballers in Chile
Expatriate footballers in Colombia